Akhenaten, Dweller in Truth is a novel written and published by Nobel Prize-winning Egyptian author Naguib Mahfouz in 1985. It was translated from Arabic into English in 1998 by Tagreid Abu-Hassabo.

The form and subject of the book is the basis for a cello concerto of the same title by Mohammed Fairouz.

Plot summary

On the way from Sais to Panopolis with his father, the scribe Meriamun points out the ruins of Akhetaten, the city that the "heretic pharaoh" Akhenaten built for his One and Only God. Seeking a balanced perspective on the events of that time, which split Egypt politically and religiously, Meriamun gets a letter of introduction from his father to many members of Akhenaten's court, among them the High Priest of Amun, his chief of security Haremhab, and his queen Nefertiti. Each tale adds a new dimension to the enigma that is Akhenaten and the thoughts of those that were close to him allow Meriamun – and the reader – to judge for themselves whether Akhenaten was a power politician or a true believer.

Characters
 The High Priest of Amun
 Ay, Akhenaten's teacher and counselor
 Haremhab, chief of security
 Bek, sculptor
 Tadukhipa, daughter of Tushratta, concubine of Amenhotep III
 Toto, chief epistoler
 Tey, Ay's wife
 Mutnedjmet, Ay's second daughter
 Meri-Ra, High Priest of the One and Only God
 Mae, commander of the armed forces
 Maho, chief of police
 Nakht, minister of Akhenaten's chamber
 Bento, Akhenaten's personal physician
 Nefertiti, Ay's first daughter and Akhenaten's wife

External links
 Dannyreviews
 LibraryThing

Novels by Naguib Mahfouz
Novels set in ancient Egypt
1985 novels
Columbia University Press books
Arabic-language novels
Novels set in the 14th century BC
Cultural depictions of Akhenaten
Horemheb
Cultural depictions of Nefertiti